Stavangerske is a defunct Norwegian ferry operator based in Stavanger. A subsidiary of Det Stavangerske Dampskibsselskap (DSD), it operates car- and passenger ferries primarily in Rogaland county. The company's ferries with less than 100 seats are operated by Fjordservice. It merged with Tide in 2007.

History
Stavangerske was created in 1990 as Rogaland Trafikkselskap to operate the domestic ferries of DSD. At the time the company had licences to operate all but one ferry in Rogaland. In 2002 Rogaland County Council created Kolumbus and it started a process with public service obligation contracts being awarded, resulting in Stavangerske losing contracts to Torghatten Trafikkselskap, L. Rødne og Sønner and Fjord1. The company changed its name in 2003.

Routes
Car ferry routes as of 2007:
Stavanger-Tau
Lauvvik-Oanes
Hjelmeland-Nesvik-Ombo
Hanasand-Judaberg-Nedstrand-Jelsa
Sand-Ropeid
Mekjarvik-Kvitsøy-Skudeneshavn

Catemaran routes:
Stavanger - Kvitsøy
Stavanger - Strand - Finnøy
Stavanger - Sand - Sauda
Stavanger - Haugesund

Local routes:
Stavanger - Lysebotn
Stavanger - Fister

Defunct shipping companies of Norway
Ferry companies of Rogaland
Companies based in Stavanger
Transport companies established in 1990
Norwegian companies established in 1990
Transport companies disestablished in 2007
2007 disestablishments in Norway
2007 mergers and acquisitions